The Suburban multiple units (SMU) are a class of electric multiple units manufactured by Walkers Limited/Downer EDI Rail, Maryborough for Queensland Rail's Citytrain division between 1994 and 2011. The SMU is divided into in three subclasses, units 201-212 as the 200 series, units 221-250 as the 220 series, and units 261-296, as the 260 series.

Formation
A Suburban Multiple Unit is a three-car unit, with the lead car being a Driver Motor fitted with motors for all variants (numbered 5), the middle car being either a motor car (numbered 6 for SMU 200 series) or trailer car (numbered 7 for SMU 220/260) with pantograph fitted, and the third car being either a Driver Trailer (SMU 200 series) or the second Driver Motor B also fitted with motors for the SMU 220 and 260 series (numbered 8) Like most trains in the Citytrain fleet, two three-car SMUs can be attached together to form one six-car unit.

History

200 series
The SMU200 series were introduced in 1994 due to a rollingstock shortage after an increase in demand. They were the first new trains since the EMU deliveries ended in 1989. Twelve were built by Walkers Limited, Maryborough with electrical equipment supplied by ABB. The trains are numbered SMU201-SMU212. The first entered service on 16 August 1994. All have driving cabs at both ends and have buttons to open the doors as opposed to handles for the EMU units.

220 series

The SMU220 series were introduced into service in August 1999 to cater for service increases on recently upgraded lines such as the Caboolture line triplication from Northgate to Lawnton. The SMU220s replaced the last remaining loco-hauled SX carriages suburban services in Brisbane. The trains are numbered SMU221-SMU250. All have motor driving cabs at both ends each coupled to the trailer power car in the middle (DMA-T-DMB) as opposed to the DM-M-DT configuration. These cars were manufactured by Walkers Limited in partnership with ADtranz. These units use more energy efficient IGBT traction packages, as opposed to the thyristors for the 200 series. The train’s body design is similar to its predecessor, albeit with a single air conditioning module in the middle of each carriage. Selected units previously had a software update installed to enable them to operate slightly higher speeds suitable for the Gold Coast line and would have the markings 'HS' on the right, but this practice was discontinued due to wheel wear issues, and the braking system not being adequately equipped.

Refurbishment
Older SMUs have undergone progressive re-configuration to seating, lighting and hand-rail arrangements to allow easier access to the elderly, parents with prams and people with disabilities, which includes people in wheelchairs. Older SMUs have been refurbished to comply with the Australian Disability Discrimination Act 1992 with the 220 series having the carpet interiors replaced with hard-wearing Linoleum flooring for low maintenance cleaning, with a blue section for seating compartments separated by red tactile bumps that are situated in doorways. Dot-matrix displays have been added alongside new automated voice announcement systems on older SMUs (the SMU260s were delivered with them already installed). These systems are used to address passengers with information such as the current and next station as well as alerting passengers where to transfer for other services.

Along with the rectification of the NGR, the government has announced that the SMU200 series will be overhauled at Maryborough extending their services into the future. Two units have already been completed under this scheme with new flooring and seat fabric among many cosmetic and mechanical improvements performed on the units.

260 series

In 2004, eight SMU260 class units were ordered from Downer EDI Rail, Maryborough to cater for increased demand. They are of a similar design to the Transperth B-series train. The first two units entered service in August 2008. These were followed by an additional 14 units. In March 2009, an additional 20 units were ordered. These units are identical in design to the IMU 160 series trains with the exception of toilets and luggage racks.

Gallery

References

External links

Suburban Multiple Unit (SMU200) Queensland Rail
Suburban Multiple Unit (SMU220) Queensland Rail
Suburban Multiple Unit (SMU260) Queensland Rail
Specifications (220 series only)

Electric multiple units of Queensland
Queensland Rail City network
Train-related introductions in 1994
25 kV AC multiple units
Walkers Limited multiple units
Bombardier Transportation multiple units